An interference fit, also known as a pressed fit or friction fit is a form of fastening between two tight fitting mating parts  that produces a joint which is held together by friction after the parts are pushed together. 

Depending on the amount of interference, parts may be joined using a tap from a hammer or pressed together using a hydraulic ram. Critical components that must not sustain damage during joining may also be cooled significantly below room temperature to shrink one of the components before fitting. This method allows the components to be joined without force and producing a shrink fit interference when the component returns to normal temperature.  Interference fits are commonly used with aircraft fasteners to improve the fatigue life of a joint.

Introducing interference between parts 
These fits, though applicable to shaft and hole assembly, are more often used for bearing-housing or bearing-shaft assembly.

Tightness of fit 
The tightness of fit is controlled by amount of interference; the allowance (planned difference from nominal size). Formulas exist  to compute allowance that will result in various strengths of fit such as loose fit, light interference fit, and interference fit. The value of the allowance depends on which material is being used, how big the parts are, and what degree of tightness is desired. Such values have already been worked out in the past for many standard applications, and they are available to engineers in the form of tables, obviating the need for re-derivation.

A slip fit can be formed when the bore diameter is  wider than the rod; or, if the rod is made 12–20μm under the given bore diameter. 

An example:
The allowance per inch of diameter usually ranges from  (0.1–0.25%),  (0.15%) being a fair average. Ordinarily the allowance per inch decreases as the diameter increases; thus the total allowance for a diameter of  might be , 0.2%), whereas for a diameter of  the total allowance might not be over  i.e., 0.11–0.12%). The parts to be assembled by forced fits are usually made cylindrical, although sometimes they are slightly tapered. Advantages of the taper form are: the possibility of abrasion of the fitted surfaces is reduced; less pressure is required in assembling; and parts are more readily separated  when renewal is required. On the other hand, the taper fit is less reliable, because if it loosens, the entire fit is free with but little axial movement. Some lubricant, such as white lead  and lard oil mixed to the consistency of paint, should be applied to the pin and bore before assembling, to reduce the tendency toward abrasion.

Assembling 
There are two basic methods for assembling an oversize shaft into an undersized hole, sometimes used in combination: force and thermal expansion or contraction.

Force 
There are at least three different terms used to describe an interference fit created via force: press fit, friction fit, and hydraulic dilation.

Press fit is achieved with presses that can press the parts together with very large amounts of force. The presses are generally hydraulic, although small hand-operated presses (such as arbor presses) may operate by means of the mechanical advantage supplied by a jackscrew or by a gear reduction driving a rack and pinion. The amount of force applied in hydraulic presses may be anything from a few pounds for the tiniest parts to hundreds of tons for the largest parts.

The edges of shafts and holes are chamfered (beveled). The chamfer forms a guide for the pressing movement, helping to distribute the force evenly around the circumference of the hole, to allow the compression to occur gradually instead of all at once, thus helping the pressing operation to be smoother, to be more easily controlled, and to require less power (less force at any one instant of time), and to assist in aligning the shaft parallel with the hole it is being pressed into. In the case of train wheelsets the wheels are pressed onto the axles by force.

Thermal expansion or contraction 
Most materials expand when heated and shrink when cooled. Enveloping parts are heated (e.g., with torches or gas ovens) and assembled into position while hot, then allowed to cool and contract back to their former size, except for the compression that results from each interfering with the other. This is also referred to as shrink-fitting. Railroad axles, wheels, and tires are typically assembled in this way. Alternatively, the enveloped part may be cooled before assembly such that it slides easily into its mating part. Upon warming, it expands and interferes. Cooling is often preferable as it is less likely than heating to change material properties, e.g., assembling a hardened gear onto a shaft, where the risk exists of heating the gear too much and drawing its temper.

See also 
 Form-fit connection

References

External links 
Diagram of an interference fit
Interference fitting – formulae for calculating clearance reductions when using interference fits for bearings on shafts and in housings

Mechanical engineering
Metalworking terminology

de:Passung#Übermaßpassung (Presspassung)
es:Interferencia_eje-agujero